Gert Schalkwyk (born 9 April 1982 in Klerksdorp, North West) is a South African footballer who plays as a midfielder for Bostancı Bağcıl in the Northern Cyprus Birinci Lig.

International career 
Schalkwyk played during 2003 and 2010 seven times for the South African national football team.

Notes

1982 births
Living people
People from Klerksdorp
Cape Coloureds
South African soccer players
South Africa international soccer players
Association football midfielders
Free State Stars F.C. players
Kaizer Chiefs F.C. players
Bidvest Wits F.C. players
Bloemfontein Celtic F.C. players
Orlando Pirates F.C. players
Maritzburg United F.C. players
Santos F.C. (South Africa) players
South African expatriate soccer players
Expatriate footballers in Northern Cyprus